Ruti Aga (born 16 January 1994) is an Ethiopian long-distance runner. She won the women's race at the 2019 Tokyo Marathon and secured five other top three finishes at the World Marathon Majors.

In 2012, Aga won the silver medal in the women's 5000 metres at the 2012 World Junior Championships in Athletics held in Barcelona, Spain. In 2013, she finished in fifth place in the junior women's race at the 2013 IAAF World Cross Country Championships staged in Bydgoszcz, Poland. The same year, she won the gold medal in the women's 5000 metres at the 2013 African Junior Athletics Championships in Bambous, Mauritius.

Aga competed in the women's marathon event at the 2019 World Athletics Championships.

Personal bests
 5000 metres – 15:13.48 (Shanghai 2013)
 10,000 metres – 33:38.39 (Addis Ababa 2013)
Road
 5 kilometres – 15:46 (Rennes 2014)
 10 kilometres – 31:35 (Tilburg 2012)
 Half marathon – 1:06:39 (Houston, TX 2018)
 Marathon – 2:18:34 (Berlin 2018)

References

External links
 

1994 births
Living people
Ethiopian female long-distance runners
Ethiopian female marathon runners
Ethiopian female cross country runners
Place of birth missing (living people)
World Athletics Championships athletes for Ethiopia
Tokyo Marathon female winners
21st-century Ethiopian women